The 1988 UK & Ireland Greyhound Racing Year was the 62nd year of greyhound racing in the United Kingdom and Ireland.

Roll of honour

Summary
The sport was experiencing a mini boom, the National Greyhound Racing Club (NGRC) released the annual returns, with totalisator turnover up nearly 30% at £98,476,532 and attendances up over 10% recorded at 4,432,117 from 5465 meetings. 

John McGee head man to Fred Wiseman was granted a trainer's licence and took charge of the kennel. He had a remarkable year as a rookie trainer winning the Greyhound Trainer of the Year and winning the 1988 English Greyhound Derby with Hit the Lid, the white and brindle dog owned by Fred Smith was also voted Greyhound of the Year. McGee also trained Sard who won the Gold Collar at Catford Stadium.

Tracks
Despite the boom in business five tracks closed, Hull, Maidstone, Gosforth, Derby and Preston all closed. Hull finished due to the fact that landlords Hull Kingston Rovers moved to a new stadium. The closure of Gosforth left the city of Newcastle with just one licensed track at Brough Park. Preston and Derby had both been opened by the same company in 1933 and after 55 years of different owners found themselves closing at the same time. Powderhall would change ownership twice, it was sold by the Greyhound Racing Association (GRA) to local businessman Norrie Rowan for £1.8m, who then sold it on himself to Coral for an instant profit at £2.2m. The GRA lost the rights to the Scottish Greyhound Derby due to the fact that they no longer owned any tracks in Scotland.  Ellesmere Port Stadium started racing on 29 February.

News
The NGRC announced that major competitions would no longer be listed as Classic races but instead they would be classed as Category One and Two races based on prize money levels. This led to many tracks that had previously never had the opportunity to hold a classic race offering increased prize money in order for their events to match the traditional classics in terms of status. The positive was the fact that prize money increased, the negative was the devaluing of some of the sports most famous races in the following years.  

Grass finally disappeared from greyhound racing when Hove became the last course to remove the turf as the circuit switched to sand. The first computerised form system called Formbank was introduced, created by Peter Shotton it revolutionised Racing Office practices and was the advent to modern day systems. 

Trainer Barney O'Connor famous for running at Walthamstow died.

Competitions
The Stewards' Cup at Walthamstow was claimed by Westmead Move, now four years old. Another bitch Exile Energy was the winner of the St Leger at Wembley, the black bitch had made the Grand Prix final and brought Gary Baggs back to the public attention for the first time since his split with Towfiq Al-Aali, his leading owner the previous year. Aali had his own success with Ernie Gaskin when his Derby finalist Comeragh Boy won the year ending Laurels. Gaskin also secured a trainers position at Walthamstow. 

The successes of bitches during 1988 continued with Wendys Dream, who won the Oaks at Wimbledon, the Byrne International and Puppy Oaks.

Principal UK races

+Track Record

Totalisator returns

The totalisator returns declared to the National Greyhound Racing Club for the year 1988 are listed below.

References 

Greyhound racing in the United Kingdom
Greyhound racing in the Republic of Ireland
UK and Ireland Greyhound Racing Year
UK and Ireland Greyhound Racing Year
UK and Ireland Greyhound Racing Year
UK and Ireland Greyhound Racing Year